The Burlington Record is a weekly newspaper in Burlington, Colorado. It is published by Prairie Mountain Publishing, which is owned by MediaNews Group. 

The Burlington Record is in its 119th year of publication.  It is a weekly and has a companion shopper, The PlainsDealer.

The paper's coverage extends to Bethune, Stratton, and Seibert.

The Burlington Record also has a commercial print division.

References

External links
The Burlington Record
Burlington Chamber of Commerce website

Newspapers published in Colorado
Kit Carson County, Colorado